Attacus dohertyi is a moth in the family Saturniidae first described by Rothschild in 1895. It is found on Timor, Flores, Roma and Damar.

References 

Saturniidae
Moths described in 1895
Moths of Asia